Sirisena is a surname. Notable people with the surname include:

Maithripala Sirisena (born 1951), Sri Lankan politician
Matarage Sirisena Amarasiri, Sri Lankan politician
Sirisena Hettige, Sri Lankan politician
H. G. Sirisena, Sri Lankan politician

Sinhalese surnames